Lining out or hymn lining, called precenting the line in Scotland, is a form of a cappella hymn-singing or hymnody in which a leader, often called the clerk or precentor, gives each line of a hymn tune as it is to be sung, usually in a chanted form giving or suggesting the tune.  It can be considered a form of call and response. First referred to as "the old way of singing" in eighteenth-century Britain, it has influenced twentieth century popular music singing styles.

In 1644, the Westminster Assembly outlined its usage in English churches "for the present, where many in the congregation cannot read". Lining out spread rapidly to the Scottish churches where it has persisted longest in Britain. It has survived to the present day among some communities and contexts, including the Gaelic psalmody on Lewis in Scotland, the Old Regular Baptists of the southern Appalachians in the United States, and for informal worship in many African American congregations.

History
Lining out first appears in 17th century Britain when literacy rates were low and books were expensive. Precenting the line was characterised by a slow, drawn-out heterophonic and often profusely ornamented melody, while a clerk or precentor (song leader) chanted the text line by line before it was sung by the congregation. It was outlined for use by the Westminster Assembly for English churches in 1644, and it has persisted longest in Britain in the Scottish Hebrides. Lining out was taken to American colonies by English and Scottish emigrants. Psalm-singing and gospel music are a mainstay of African American churchgoers. The great influx of Presbyterians from the Scottish Highlands into the Carolinas might have introduced some African slaves to this form of worship, though this extent to which this influenced African-American church singing has been disputed, due to the fact that English, lowland Scottish, and Ulster-Scots colonists, all of whom would have lined hymns, were far more numerous than the Highlanders in the region and could more easily have influenced the African Americans.

The tide turned against lining out in England and New England in the first quarter of the 18th century, with greater literacy, improved availability of texts such as New Version of the Psalms of David (1696) by Nahum Tate and Nicholas Brady, and more widely available and better-printed tune collections. Influential clerics in England and America disliked the ragged nature of the singing that resulted as the congregation struggled to remember both the tune and the words from the lining out. However, it continued to be practiced in most rural churches and still survives today in a form which likely would have been familiar to the original English and Ulster-Scots colonists in isolated communities in the Appalachian mountains.

Lining out was in most places replaced by "regular singing," in which either the congregation knew a small number of tunes like Old 100th that could be fitted to many different texts in standard meters such as Long Meter, or a tunebook was used along with a word book. There began to be "singing societies" of young men who met one evening a week to rehearse.  As time went on, a section of the church was allocated for these trained voices to sit together as a choir, and churches voted to end the lining out system (although there was often a transitional phase that had the entire congregation singing from tunebooks like the still-popular Sacred Harp and others, before this was taken over by using trained choirs; this gave birth to the still vibrant tradition of "Sacred harp singing").  We have a vivid picture of the transition in Worcester, Massachusetts:

Current usage

Some Christian churches in the U.S. still practice lining out.  While some churches calling themselves Primitive Baptist or Regular Baptist use it, this form of singing predominates among the Old Regular Baptist churches.  The practice is becoming attenuated in some of them—the leader will begin lining out, but after the first verse or two will say "Sing on!", or a part of the service is lined out but other parts are not—so it is unclear how long it will survive.

Some Presbyterian churches in Scotland also still do lining out, though often now in a restricted context, with other hymns being accompanied and not lined out.  The practice is now more common in Gaelic psalm singing than in English, and indeed is often considered a characteristic of Gaelic culture, especially on the Isle of Lewis. Unlike other denominations that carry on the tradition of lining out, Gaelic churches practice Exclusive Psalmody.

Lining of hymns is still widely practiced by the three traditional branches of the Hutterites (Lehrerleut, Dariusleut, Schmiedeleut II). It may also be heard among some conservative Anabaptist churches, such as German Baptist Brethren, Old Order Mennonites, and the Old Order River Brethren.

In popular culture

In the film Coal Miner's Daughter, lining out is depicted at the funeral of Loretta Lynn's father, Ted Webb.

Bibliography
 Dargan, William T. (2006). Lining Out the Word: Dr. Watts Hymn Singing in the Music of Black Americans, University of California Press. 
 Smythe Babcock Mathews, William. (2010). A Hundred Years of Music in America: An Account of Musical Effort in America, Nabu Press.

References

External links
African American hymn choirs and prayer bands from North Carolina, South Carolina, the District of Columbia and Maryland who sing traditional lined out hymns
Hope Old Regular Baptist Services with audio files of preaching and singing
Several linked references to the historical evolution of lining out
Playable examples of lined-out hymns recorded in the 1990s by Old Regular Baptists in Kentucky
Lined-Out Hymnody
Lining out in a Mississippi congregation, with a playable example
Review comparing shape note or Sacred Harp hymnody with lining out

Musical techniques
Christian music genres
Singing
Church music
Song forms
A cappella
Vocal music
Musical terminology
Church of Scotland